Events during the year 1192 in Italy.

Events 
 Empress Constance, captured by the Sicilians in 1191, is released under the pressure of the Pope, and returns to Germany.

Years of the 12th century in Italy
Italy
Italy